Mahmadtohir Zokirzoda is a politician from Tajikistan who is serving as President and Chairmen of Assembly of Representatives of Tajikistan.

References 

Members of the Assembly of Representatives (Tajikistan)
Year of birth missing (living people)
Living people